Vincent Candrawinata (born July 22, 1989) is an Australian clinical nutritionist, researcher and food scientist.

Career
Candrawinata undertook a research project with The University of Newcastle from 2011 to 2014 to determine the possibility of extracting and activating  Phenolics contained within fruit produce. Through a process involving only water, he invented the scientific method of doing that which resulted in the creation of Activated Phenolics. The produce used involved apples.

In October 2016, he was awarded the Young Alumni Award by The University of Newcastle.

Renovatio Bioscience
In 2015, he patented the process and founded Renovatio Bioscience to commercialize the scientific invention and created products under the brand Activated Phenolics. The firm is based in Sydney. In 2017, the firm launched a skin cream containing activated phenolics called APSKIN. In 2020 the company launched additional products which are stocked in Woolworths.

References

Australian medical researchers
Living people
1989 births